Claude Nicholson may refer to:
Claude Nicholson (rugby league) (1892–1951), Australian rugby league player
Claude Nicholson (British Army officer) (1898–1943), British Army brigadier of World War II